The Hawaii International Conference on Education (HICE) is an annual conference for Education academics and professionals currently sponsored by Pepperdine University, The University of Louisville, California State University, East Bay, and New Horizons in Education. The conference provides a platform for panel discussions and the presentation of peer-reviewed education research papers. Papers selected for presentation appear in the Proceedings of the Hawaii International Conference on Education, which have grown to constitute nearly 45,000 pages of refereed material in the 9-year history of the conference.

The first HICE took place in 2003. The conference now attracts over 1100 representatives from over 40 countries.

HICE Conferences
Past HICE conferences include:

References

External links
Hawaii International Conference on Education

Academic conferences
International conferences in the United States
Recurring events established in 2003
2003 establishments in Hawaii
Annual events in Hawaii